C More Entertainment AB is a pay television company that previously operated as Canal+. It targets Nordic countries and has a separate channel in Sweden (C More Film).

The main competitors of C More Entertainment are Viasat Film and Viasat Sport, which are part of Nordic Entertainment Group (NENT) since 2018.

Since 30 October 2012, the C More channels in Finland are bundled with MTV Oy's premium channels. The combined package was initially named MTV3 Total (later MTV Total) but was changed back to C More in 2017.

Ownership history
South African company MultiChoice launched the Nordic version of FilmNet in 1985, and SuperSport followed in 1995. The channels were renamed Canal+ in 1997 after MultiChoice sold most of its European operations to French company Groupe Canal+. In 2003, two private equity firms, Baker Capital and Nordic Capital, acquired 100% of Canal+ Television from the international media conglomerate Vivendi Universal. At the same time, the company changed its legal name to C More Entertainment, but it retained the right to use the “Canal+” trademark. On 9 February 2005 SBS Broadcasting Group announced the acquisition of C More Entertainment. Belgian SBS channels VT4 and VIJFtv launched their VOD offering under the C-More brand in October 2006. On 16 June 2008 Swedish TV4 Gruppen announced it had acquired C More Entertainment from German ProSiebenSat.1 Media (which acquired SBS) for €320 million. In May 2010 Telenor bought 35% of shares in C More Entertainment from TV4 Gruppen for SEK787 million, but sold them back in 2014.

Programming
C More Entertainment operated over 20 SD channels in the Nordic region and eleven HD channels in September 2012.

1990s 
C More Entertainment was originated from the Filmnet channel created in 1985. In the early 1990s, Filmnet became two channels: Filmnet Plus and The Complete Movie Channel: Filmnet. They were later rebranded as Filmnet 1 and Filmnet 2.

Canal+ bought Filmnet in 1996 and the two channels were renamed on 1 September 1997. Filmnet 1 became "Canal+" with localized versions for the different Nordic countries and Filmnet 2 became the pan-Nordic "Canal+ Gul/Canal+ Kulta" ( "Canal+ Yellow/Canal+ Gold," following the colour naming pattern used by Canal+ in France and other countries).

A third channel "Canal+ Blå/Canal+ Sininen" (Blue) was created on 3 September 1999.

2000s 
"Canal+ Zap/
Rød/Punainen" (Red) was launched on 22 September 2001, allowing cable and satellite viewers to choose an alternative match to watch during fixtures of the FA Premier League and National Hockey League.

The channels were redesigned on 1 May 2004. The three colour-coded mixed channels were replaced with four themed channels. The Canal+ line-up consisted of the main Canal+ channel, Canal+ Film 1 and Canal+ Film 2 showing new movies, the all-sports channel Canal+ Sport, and C More Film, a channel showing older films. C More Film was the first channel to use the C More name.

The line-up was extended on 1 September 2005, when Canal+ Film 3, C More Film 2, and C More HD were launched. C More HD was the first HD channel for the Nordic region. Canal+ Film 1 was renamed "Canal+ Film". Canal+ Sport was split into country-specific channels. Canal+, which had been country-specific, became pan-Nordic. At the same time, IPTV operators in association with satellite operator Canal Digital launched an interactive VOD service called "Canal+ Play", accessed from the customer's set-top box, letting the viewers watch any seasons from any show ebroadcast on Canal+ and any movie that was showing on the channels. On satellite it has since been merged to the Canal Digital Go service, covering every channel on the platform and also available without a box online (much like its British equivalent Sky Go).

On 1 November 2006 the C More Film and C More Film 2 channels were merged with Canal+ Film 2 and the main Canal+ channel was replaced by a bonus channel Canal+ Mix, showing series, entertainment, music, sports, children’s programmings,  documentaries and movies. C More also introduced a new sports channel called Canal+ Sport 2. Three channels were renamed: Canal+ Film was renamed back to "Canal+ Film 1", Canal+ Sport became Canal+ Sport 1", and C More HD became "Canal+ HD". Customers previously could only subscribe to all channels, but customers were now able to only subscribe to the sports or movie channels. The "Canal+ Film" package consisted of Canal+ Film 1, 2 and 3 and "Canal+ Sport" consisted of Canal+ Sport 1 and 2. The full package was called "Canal+ Total" and contains Canal+ Mix and Canal+ HD as a bonus.

On 1 February 2007 Canal+ HD was split to 2 channels in HD: Canal+ Film HD airs movies in HD and Canal+ Sport HD airs sports events in HD. In September 2007 a pay-per-view sports service called C Sports was launched in Sweden, Denmark and Norway. It was never launched in Finland or available in Finnish but could also be viewed there. The service initially showed single matches from Canal+ channels on a PPV basis, but soon after launch customers could also subscribe to a season ticket. This allowed them to view all matches from a chosen league during its season. In 2009 it was expanded to cover an archive of all shown matches and the ability to watch live streams of all Canal+ Sport's channels. The service is still available in all countries except for Finland, where the content of the service is now available through parent company MTV3's VOD service Katsomo.

The channel were again redesigned on 1 November 2007. The movies and series channels were all renamed and recategorised. Canal+ Film 1 became "Canal+ First", specialized in new movies, as well as series and Canal+ Film 2 was replaced by "Canal+ Hits", specialized in classic and old movies. Canal+ Film 3 and Canal+ Mix were renamed "Canal+ Action", specialized in action movies and series and "Canal+ Drama", specialized in TV shows and movies related to drama and romantic and were joined by Canal+ Comedy which broadcasts movies in different genres. Canal+ Sport 1 and 2 kept their names but were joined by Canal+ Sport Extra which time-shared overnights with Canal 69, specialized in pornographic movies.

In July 2009, C More Entertainment launched Canal 9, a new sports channel, and another program for men. Canal 9 was free for Canal+ Sport and Canal+ Total customers on cable, satellite and IPTV and shared many sports rights with Canal+ channels, along with its independently purchased rights commissioned by TV4 Gruppen. The station was modeled on the Finnish MTV3 Max. There have been discussions to rename MTV3 Max as Canal 9 Suomi. In November 2011 Canal 9 also launched in Norway.

On 1 October 2009 Canal+ launched the SF-kanalen, a channel which broadcasts Swedish movies and miniseries from the libraries of Svensk Filmindustri. After TV4's purchase of the company, Canal+ and Svensk Filmindustri became part of the same corporation. SF-kanalen replaced Canal 69, which ceased operations the day before.

2010s 
On 1 April 2010 Canal+ Comedy was replaced by Canal+ Series. It was similar to Canal+ Hits, but it showed series from 8pm to midnight instead of movies, while from midnight to 8pm it showed movies.

On 14 May 2010 C More Entertainment launched three sports channels named Canal+ Sport 3, Canal+ Football and Canal+ Hockey. Canal+ Sport 3 was only available in Norway. At the same time, many new sports rights were announced. Later that year Canal+ announced it would launch a second Finnish-language sports channel called Canal+ Aitio ( Canal+ Skybox) in December, since it retained the Finnish rights to Premier League and UEFA Champions League matches. The new channel allowed broadcasting a second simultaneous match from the Premier League, previously only possible on FTA channels. Canal+ also launched a new channel for Finnish viewers called "Canal+ Urheilu". HD versions of the channels have since appeared on all platforms.

On 1 June 2011 Canal+ launched two movies and series channels named Canal+ Family and Canal+ Emotion. Canal+ Family consists of family-oriented movies and children’s programmings. At the same time, Canal+ Drama was renamed as Canal+ Emotion.

In May 2012, C More Entertainment announced it would rebrand itself as C More. While most channels kept their previous names (apart from replacing the Canal+ suffix with C More), some sports channels were renamed. Canal+ Sport 1 was changed to C More Sport, Canal+ Sport 2 was changed to C More Tennis, Canal+ Sport Extra to C More Extreme, and Canal+ Extra channels were renamed to C More Live. The only channels unchanged during the rebrand are Canal 9 and the Danish Canal 8 Sport, which was launched in August 2012 as the successor of Canal+ Sport 1 Denmark. C More Entertainment also announced that it would add documentaries as a new type of programming to complement their film programming.

On 30 October 2012, C More channels in Finland were merged with MTV3 Kanavapaketti to form MTV3 Total. C More Urheilu (Sport), C More Aitio and C More Premier HD were renamed MTV3 MAX Sport 1, MTV3 MAX Sport 2 and MTV3 MAX Premier HD, respectively. The package was renamed MTV Total in the corporate-wide rebrand at MTV Oy in 2013, and then changed back to C More in 2017. As a result of the 2017 rebrand, MTV Oy's MTV Junior and MTV Max were renamed C More Juniori and C More Max, respectively.

In October 2012, C More launched Filmnet in Sweden, an online streaming service to compete with Netflix and HBO Nordic. Filmnet was available in Norway and Finland in early 2013. In Denmark, C More worked with YouSee on a similar service called YouBio. The Filmnet-branded services were moved to the main C More website on 30 June 2015.

Television channels
Movies and Entertainment Group

C More First (formerly Canal+ Film 1, Canal+ Film and Canal+ First. Replaced Canal+ Gul.)
C More Hits (formerly Canal+ Film 2 and Canal+ Hits. Replaced Canal+ Blå.)
C More Juniori (Finland only. Formerly Subtv Juniori, Sub Juniori, MTV3 Juniori and MTV Juniori.)
C More Series (formerly Canal+ Series. Replaced Canal+ Comedy.)
C More Stars
SF-kanalen

Discontinued:
C More Action (formerly Canal+ Film 3 and Canal+ Action)
C More Emotion (formerly Canal+ Emotion. Replaced Canal+ Drama.)
C More Film
C More Film 2
C More Kids (formerly Canal+ Family)
Canal+ Blå (replaced by Canal+ Film 2)
Canal+ Comedy (replaced by Canal+ Series)
Canal+ Drama (replaced by Canal+ Emotion)
Canal+ Film HD (formerly C More HD and Canal+ HD)
Canal+ Gul (replaced by Canal+ Film 1)

Sports Group

C More Fotboll (Sweden only. Formerly Canal+ Football.)
C More Golf (Denmark and Sweden)
C More Hockey (Norway and Sweden. Formerly Canal+ Hockey.)
C More Live (Norway and Sweden. Formerly Canal+ Extra.)
C More Live 2 (Norway and Sweden. Formerly Canal+ Extra 2.)
C More Live 3 (Norway and Sweden. Formerly Canal+ Extra 3.)
C More Live 4 (Norway and Sweden. Formerly Canal+ Extra 4.)
C More Max (Finland only. Formerly MTV3 MAX and MTV Max.)
C More Sport (Sweden only. Formerly Canal+ Sport and Canal+ Sport 1. Replaced Canal+ Zap.)
C More Sport 1 (Finland only. Formerly Canal+ Sport 1, Canal+ Urheilu, MTV3 MAX Sport 1 and MTV Sport 1.)
C More Sport 2 (Finland only. Formerly Canal+ Sport 2, Canal+ Aitio, MTV3 MAX Sport 2 and MTV Sport 2.)
Sportkanalen (Sweden only)

Discontinued:
C More Extreme (formerly Canal+ Sport Extra)
C More Live 5 (Norway and Sweden. Replaced C More Tennis.)
C More Premier HD (Finland only. Formerly Canal+ Premier HD. Renamed MTV MAX Premier HD.)
C More Tennis (replaced Canal+ Sport 2)
Canal 8 Sport (Denmark only. Sold to Discovery Communications. Replaced Canal+ Sport 1.)
Canal 9 (Denmark only. Sold to Discovery Communications.)
Canal+ Sport 2 (replaced by C More Tennis)
Canal+ Sport HD

OnDemand Services
C More Play
Filmnet (Sweden only)
C Sports (Sweden, Denmark and Norway)

Rights 
The premium pay-TV concept used by C More Entertainment is based on exclusive broadcasting rights. These broadcasting rights include sports, movies and TV series.

Sports rights
Football
Serie A (Sweden only)
Real Madrid TV
Arsenal TV
Barça TV
Milan TV
Liga BBVA (Finland and Sweden only)
Major League Soccer (excluding Finland)
UEFA Champions League (only in Finland)
UEFA Europa League (only in Finland)
UEFA Euro 2012 (Denmark and Norway only)
Motorsports (excluding Finland)
Swedish Speedway Championship
Swedish Touring Car Championship
IndyCar Series
Formula 3
BTCC
Tennis
Wimbledon
French Open
ATP
WTA
Ice Hockey
Swedish Hockey League
IIHF World Championship
Other sports
NBA
UFC
Diamond League (only in Finland)

Film and TV rights
In 2011, C More Entertainment had exclusive first-run deals for feature films and TV series with Fox Entertainment Group, DreamWorks, Home Box Office, MGM, Nonstop Entertainment, Paramount Pictures, Sandrew Metronome, Svensk Filmindustri, Warner Bros. Pictures and Zentropa.

See also
List of programs broadcast by C More

References

External links
C More Sweden
C More Denmark
C More Norway
C More Finland

Mass media companies of Sweden
Pan-Nordic television channels
Television channels and stations established in 1997
Television networks in Sweden
TV4 AB